Anders Järryd and Hans Simonsson were the defending champions but only Järryd competed that year with John Fitzgerald.

Fitzgerald and Järryd won in the final 6–3, 6–2 against Mark Edmondson and Kim Warwick.

Seeds

  John Fitzgerald /  Anders Järryd (champions)
  Paul Annacone /  Christo van Rensburg (first round)
  Mark Edmondson /  Kim Warwick (final)
  Andrés Gómez /  Ivan Lendl (quarterfinals)

Draw

External links
1985 Custom Credit Australian Indoor Championships Doubles Draw

Doubles